In mathematics a polydivisible number (or magic number) is a number in a given number base with digits abcde... that has the following properties:

 Its first digit a is not 0.
 The number formed by its first two digits ab is a multiple of 2.
 The number formed by its first three digits abc is a multiple of 3.
 The number formed by its first four digits abcd is a multiple of 4.
 etc.

Definition
Let  be a positive integer, and let  be the number of digits in n written in base b. The number n is a polydivisible number if for all ,
 . 

 Example

For example, 10801 is a seven-digit polydivisible number in base 4, as

Enumeration
For any given base , there are only a finite number of polydivisible numbers.

Maximum polydivisible number
The following table lists maximum polydivisible numbers for some bases b, where  represent digit values 10 to 35.

Let  be the number of digits. The function  determines the number of polydivisible numbers that has  digits in base , and the function  is the total number of polydivisible numbers in base .

On average, each polydivisible number with  digits can be extended to a polydivisible number with  digits in  different ways. This leads to the following estimate for :

Summing over all values of n, this estimate suggests that the total number of polydivisible numbers will be approximately

Specific bases
All numbers are represented in base , using A−Z to represent digit values 10 to 35.

Base 2

Base 3

Base 4

Base 5
The polydivisible numbers in base 5 are 
1, 2, 3, 4, 11, 13, 20, 22, 24, 31, 33, 40, 42, 44, 110, 113, 132, 201, 204, 220, 223, 242, 311, 314, 330, 333, 402, 421, 424, 440, 443, 1102, 1133, 1322, 2011, 2042, 2200, 2204, 2231, 2420, 2424, 3113, 3140, 3144, 3302, 3333, 4022, 4211, 4242, 4400, 4404, 4431, 11020, 11330, 13220, 20110, 20420, 22000, 22040, 22310, 24200, 24240, 31130, 31400, 31440, 33020, 33330, 40220, 42110, 42420, 44000, 44040, 44310, 110204, 113300, 132204, 201102, 204204, 220000, 220402, 223102, 242000, 242402, 311300, 314000, 314402, 330204, 333300, 402204, 421102, 424204, 440000, 440402, 443102, 1133000, 1322043, 2011021, 2042040, 2204020, 2420003, 2424024, 3113002, 3140000, 3144021, 4022042, 4211020, 4431024, 11330000, 13220431, 20110211, 20420404, 24200031, 31400004, 31440211, 40220422, 42110202, 44310242, 132204314, 201102110, 242000311, 314000044, 402204220, 443102421, 1322043140, 2011021100, 3140000440, 4022042200

The smallest base 5 polydivisible numbers with n digits are
1, 11, 110, 1102, 11020, 110204, 1133000, 11330000, 132204314, 1322043140, none...

The largest base 5 polydivisible numbers with n digits are
4, 44, 443, 4431, 44310, 443102, 4431024, 44310242, 443102421, 4022042200, none...

The number of base 5 polydivisible numbers with n digits are
4, 10, 17, 21, 21, 21, 13, 10, 6, 4, 0, 0, 0...

Base 10
The polydivisible numbers in base 10 are
1, 2, 3, 4, 5, 6, 7, 8, 9, 10, 12, 14, 16, 18, 20, 22, 24, 26, 28, 30, 32, 34, 36, 38, 40, 42, 44, 46, 48, 50, 52, 54, 56, 58, 60, 62, 64, 66, 68, 70, 72, 74, 76, 78, 80, 82, 84, 86, 88, 90, 92, 94, 96, 98, 102, 105, 108, 120, 123, 126, 129, 141, 144, 147, 162, 165, 168, 180, 183, 186, 189, 201, 204, 207, 222, 225, 228, 243, 246, 249, 261, 264, 267, 282, 285, 288... 

The smallest base 10 polydivisible numbers with n digits are
1, 10, 102, 1020, 10200, 102000, 1020005, 10200056, 102000564, 1020005640, 10200056405, 102006162060, 1020061620604, 10200616206046, 102006162060465, 1020061620604656, 10200616206046568, 108054801036000018, 1080548010360000180, 10805480103600001800, ... 

The largest base 10 polydivisible numbers with n digits are
9, 98, 987, 9876, 98765, 987654, 9876545, 98765456, 987654564, 9876545640, 98765456405, 987606963096, 9876069630960, 98760696309604, 987606963096045, 9876062430364208, 98485872309636009, 984450645096105672, 9812523240364656789, 96685896604836004260, ... 

The number of base 10 polydivisible numbers with n digits are
9, 45, 150, 375, 750, 1200, 1713, 2227, 2492, 2492, 2225, 2041, 1575, 1132, 770, 571, 335, 180, 90, 44, 18, 12, 6, 3, 1, 0, 0, 0, 0, 0, 0, 0, 0, 0, 0, 0, 0, 0, 0, 0, 0, 0, 0, 0, 0, 0, 0, 0, 0, 0, ...

Programming example
The example below searches for polydivisible numbers in Python.
from typing import List

def find_polydivisible(base: int) -> list[int]:
    """Find polydivisible number."""
    numbers = []
    previous = [i for i in range(1, base)]
    new = []
    digits = 2
    while not previous == []:
        numbers.append(previous)
        for n in previous:
            for j in range(0, base):
                number = n * base + j
                if number % digits == 0:
                    new.append(number)
        previous = new
        new = []
        digits = digits + 1
    return numbers

Related problems
Polydivisible numbers represent a generalization of the following well-known problem in recreational mathematics:

 Arrange the digits 1 to 9 in order so that the first two digits form a multiple of 2, the first three digits form a multiple of 3, the first four digits form a multiple of 4 etc. and finally the entire number is a multiple of 9.

The solution to the problem is a nine-digit polydivisible number with the additional condition that it contains the digits 1 to 9 exactly once each. There are 2,492 nine-digit polydivisible numbers, but the only one that satisfies the additional condition is

381 654 729

Other problems involving polydivisible numbers include:

 Finding polydivisible numbers with additional restrictions on the digits - for example, the longest polydivisible number that only uses even digits is 

48 000 688 208 466 084 040

 Finding palindromic polydivisible numbers - for example, the longest palindromic polydivisible number is

30 000 600 003

 A common, trivial extension of the aforementioned example is to arrange the digits 0 to 9 to make a 10 digit number in the same way, the result is 3816547290. This is a pandigital polydivisible number.

References

External links
 YouTube - a pandigital number that is also polydivisible

Base-dependent integer sequences
Modular arithmetic